The Poland women's national football team represents Poland in international women's football. The team, controlled by the Polish Football Association, has never qualified for a major international tournament.

History
Poland is one of the earliest nation in Europe to begin developing women's football, having fielded its female team for the first time in 1981, for a friendly against Italy away. Poland's debut ended with a 0–3 defeat in Catania.

Since its inception, Poland has little success at the international stage, and has failed to qualify for any major tournament, although the team has come close in several occasions. This has been largely due to most of its female footballers are not professional, many Polish female footballers are part-timers, unlike the far more successful men's counterparts. Despite their part-time status, the fact that the team has seen its rise in fortune since 2010s, having come very close in qualifying for UEFA Women's Euro 2013, 2022, as well as the 2011, 2015 and 2023 FIFA Women's World Cups were seen as signs of potential growth of the women's team.

Since late 2010s, more efforts have been put in order to give the female national team more recognition. After failing to qualify for the UEFA Women's Euro 2022, the PZPN has undertaken the step to bid for the UEFA Women's Euro 2025, with the establishment of a separate women's football department, while the domestic women's league of Poland, Ekstraliga, is also moving toward establishing full-time professionalism in undisclosed dates.

Team image

Nicknames
The Poland women's national football team has been known or nicknamed as "Biało-czerwone (The white and reds)" or "ORLICE (The Eaglesses)".

Results and fixtures

 The following is a list of match results in the last 12 months, as well as any future matches that have been scheduled.

Legend

2022

2023

Coaching staff

Current coaching staff

Manager history

Players
Up-to-date caps, goals, and statistics are not publicly available; therefore, caps and goals listed may be incorrect.

Current squad
 The following players called up for a friendly match against Sweden on 13 April 2021.
 Caps and goals (unofficial) are updated as of 7 March 2021.

Recent call-ups
 The following players were also named to a squad in the last 12 months.

Records

 Active players in bold, statistics correct as of 2020.

Most capped players

Top goalscorers

Competitive record

FIFA Women's World Cup

*Draws include knockout matches decided on penalty kicks.

Olympic Games

UEFA Women's Championship

Algarve Cup

See also

Sport in Poland
Football in Poland
Women's football in Poland
Poland women's national under-20 football team
Poland women's national under-17 football team
Poland men's national football team

Notes

References

External links
Official website 
FIFA profile 

 
European women's national association football teams